Anca Bergmann (born ) is a Romanian female former volleyball player, playing as a middle-blocker. She was part of the Romania women's national volleyball team.

She competed at the 2001 Women's European Volleyball Championship.

References

1976 births
Living people
Romanian women's volleyball players
Place of birth missing (living people)